The Journal of Vietnamese Studies is a quarterly peer-reviewed academic journal covering social science and humanities research about Vietnamese history, politics, culture and, society. It was established in 2006, and is published by University of California Press on behalf of the Center for Southeast Asia Studies at the University of California, Berkeley. Since September 2022, the editors-in-chief are Martha Lincoln (San Francisco State University), Van Nguyen-Marshall (Trent University), and Peter Zinoman (University of California, Berkeley). The journal publishes original articles, book reviews, communications with the editor, and occasionally also translations of Vietnamese language documents and texts.

Abstracting and indexing
The journal is abstracted and indexed in:
Emerging Sources Citation Index
International Bibliography of Periodical Literature
International Bibliography of the Social Sciences
Index Islamicus
Modern Language Association Database
ProQuest databases
Scopus

References

External links

Publications established in 2006
Asian studies journals
Vietnamese diaspora
University of California Press academic journals
Vietnamese studies
Works about Vietnam
Quarterly journals